Truszki may refer to the following places:
Truszki, Masovian Voivodeship (east-central Poland)
Truszki, Gmina Piątnica in Podlaskie Voivodeship (northeast Poland)
Truszki, Gmina Śniadowo in Podlaskie Voivodeship (northeast Poland)